"A Little Bit More" is a song written and performed by Bobby Gosh, released on his 1973 album Sitting in the Quiet. The first hit version was recorded by the band Dr. Hook; their version was released as a single in 1976. It charted at number 11 on the US Billboard Hot 100, and spent two weeks at number nine on the Cash Box Top 100. It reached number two on the UK Singles Chart in July 1976 for five consecutive weeks, being held from the top spot by Elton John and Kiki Dee's "Don't Go Breaking My Heart". It was Dr. Hook's joint second-best UK chart placing, matching "Sylvia's Mother" and surpassed only by "When You're in Love with a Beautiful Woman".

Chart performance

Weekly singles charts

Year-end charts

911 version

English boy band 911 recorded their own version of "A Little Bit More" for their third studio album, There It Is (1999). It was released on 11 January 1999 in the United Kingdom and debuted at number one on the UK Singles Chart on 17 January 1999, becoming their only number-one single. It also reached number seven on the Irish Singles Chart, becoming the band's only single to enter the top 30 in Ireland, and number 46 in New Zealand.

Track listings
UK CD1 and cassette single, Australian CD single
 "A Little Bit More" (radio mix) – 3:46
 "Don't Walk Away" – 4:00
 "Nothing Stops the Rain" (French version) – 3:34

UK CD2
 "A Little Bit More" (original version) – 3:46
 "Baby Come Back to Me" – 4:26
 "All I Want Is You" (Spanish version) – 3:50

Charts

Weekly charts

Year-end charts

Certifications

Other recordings
The song has also been recorded by: 
Lynn Anderson (1977)
Ronnie McDowell (1992)
Lars Roos (1992)
Shane Richie (1998)

References

1973 songs
1976 singles
1999 singles
Dr. Hook & the Medicine Show songs
Song recordings produced by Ron Haffkine
Number-one singles in Denmark
Number-one singles in Scotland
UK Singles Chart number-one singles
911 (English group) songs
Capitol Records singles
Virgin Records singles